Hot Bird 13C, formerly Hot Bird 9, is a communications satellite operated by Eutelsat, launched 20 December 2008 aboard an Ariane 5ECA carrier rocket along with the Eutelsat W2M spacecraft. It was built by EADS Astrium, based on a Eurostar E3000 satellite bus. It was positioned in geosynchronous orbit at 13°E. After in-orbit testing it will provide communications services to Asia, Europe, Americas, North Africa and the Middle East, with 64 NATO J-band (IEEE Ku band) transponders.

The satellite has a mass of 4,880 kilograms, and an expected service life of 15 years. It is identical to the Hot Bird 8 and Hot Bird 10 satellites.

References

External links

 Hot Bird 13C at the European Telecommunications Satellite Organization official website.
 Hot Bird 13C frequency chart on LyngSat
 

Communications satellites in geostationary orbit
Spacecraft launched in 2008
Satellites using the Eurostar bus
Eutelsat satellites
Ariane commercial payloads